Thérèse de Dillmont (10 October 1846 – 22 May 1890) was an Austrian needleworker and writer. Dillmont's Encyclopedia of Needlework (1886) has been translated into 17 languages. She owned a string of shops in European capitals and she was "one of the most important pioneers in the international and multicultural enterprise of hobby needlework in the late nineteenth century".

Life
Thérèse Maria Josepha de Dillmont was born in 1846 in Wiener Neustadt, the youngest of five children. Her mother was Franziska Schwendtenwein and her father, Ferdinand, was a Professor of architecture at the Military Academy. Dillmont attended an embroidery school founded by the Empress Marie-Theresa. After her father died in 1857, Dillmont was brought up and educated in Vienna.

In 1884 Dillmont left the embroidery school that she had started with her sister Franziska and moved to France where she wrote her encyclopedia. Dillmont's book on needlework was published after Sophia Frances Anne Caulfeild and Blanche Catherine Saward Dictionary of Needlework. Creators of these vast works were assisted by the copyright law which allowed authors to freely borrow material from periodicals. The book pulled together thousands of textile designs from many different countries including Egypt, Bulgaria, Turkey and China.

Dillmont commented on including instructions for hand sewing when machine sewing was much faster:
What is the use of describing all the old well-known stitches, 
when machines have so nearly superseded the slower process of hand-sewing?

She did however include a section on machine sewing. This work was aimed at the fashion for needlework and it competed with the Dictionary of Needlework and Weldon's Practical Needlework which was published in monthly parts from 1886. Dillmont's book was tied in with Dollfus-Meig et Cie, a French thread company, and these products were recommended to her readers. In 1884 she had started working with the Alsatian-French textile firm (DMC) at Mulhouse after signing an agreement on 26 October 1884 with Jean Dollfus.

Dollfus was introducing new processes like mercerized cotton, and with Dillmont's help, DMC became known for its publications that stood out from previous books because they included clear instructions and illustrations for their designs. Dillmont's own textile school was at Dornach near Mulhouse, but Dillmont travelled widely as she had her own shops in Vienna, London, Paris and Berlin.

Dillmont died after just four months of marriage at the age of 45.

Legacy
Dillmont's name was an asset to the DMC company and they continued to publish books under her name after her death. Over 100 books were attributed to Dillmont or her niece who was said to have an identical name. The books continued to be improved and iron-on transfers were included in her books in the twentieth century. In 2004 a translation of her encyclopedia into Russian was published. Her work is available in seventeen languages.

Works include
 Encyclopédie des ouvrages des dames. Translated as Encyclopedia of Needlework, 1886.
 Album de broderies au point de croix, 3 vols., [c.1890]
 "Irish Crochet Lace" Mulhouse, Dollfus-Mieg & Cie, [c.1900]

References

External links

 
 
 Thérèse de Dillmont 

1846 births
1890 deaths
People from Wiener Neustadt
Textile artists
Women encyclopedists
Needlework
19th-century Austrian women writers
19th-century women textile artists
19th-century textile artists
French-language writers from Austria
Embroiderers